The City of York was a constituency represented in the House of Commons of the Parliament of the United Kingdom. It elected one Member of Parliament (MP) by the first past the post system of election.

Boundaries
1885-1918: The existing parliamentary borough, and so much of the municipal borough of York (including the parts added thereto by the York Extension and Improvement Act 1884) as was not already included in the parliamentary borough.

1918–1950: The County Borough of York.

1950–1974: As prior but with redrawn boundaries.

1974–1983: As prior but with redrawn boundaries.

1983–1997: As prior but County Borough of York renamed the City of York.

1997–2010: As prior but constituency renamed City of York.

This constituency covered most of the city of York, though the outer parts of the city and local council area fell within the Selby, Vale of York and Ryedale constituencies.

History
By virtue of its importance, York was regularly represented in Parliament from an early date: it had been required to send delegates to the assembly of 1265, but no actual returns survive until the end of the 13th century. The structure of the civic government of the city provided the basis by which it elected its Parliamentary representatives. In the years following the city's Royal Charter, granted in the 1150s, power was held by a Lord Mayor and associated bailiffs. Further expansion of governance saw the establishment of coroners, sheriffs and aldermen. The appointment of twelve aldermen in 1399 led to the establishment of the City Council. Subsequently, other tiers of governance, such as the probi homines and the communitas, would eventually provide the bodies for the election of MPs. Those who occupied such positions were all freemen of the city and frequently came form the mercantile classes rather than the nobility, and were considered the electorate  of the city. In the beginnings of the constituency this electorate was about twenty four, but had risen to around seventy five by 1690. Early in the 18th century, the number of freemen being made had increased significantly and this further increased the electorate. By the election of 1830, there were about 3,800 registered voters.

There was a period between 1581 and 1597 where elections were a two-stage process. In the first stage, member of the common chamber of the council and 50 freeholders cast votes and the top four contenders would progress to a second ballot. This ballot was conducted by the Lord Mayor and the aldermen and the top two would be returned as MPs. In 1597 this process was reduced to a single ballot whereby all of those in both the commons and assembly of York would cast two votes. The two contenders with the most votes were returned as MP. From 1628 the process became fully open, as previously the process had an element of pre-approval by the Lord mayor and the aldermen.

A borough constituency consisting of the city of York has been represented in every Parliament since the Model Parliament of 1295. Until 1918, it returned two MPs; since then it has returned one. Until 1997, when its official name became City of York with no boundary changes, the constituency was usually simply called York.

Following their review of parliamentary representation in North Yorkshire, the Boundary Commission for England recommended the creation of two new seats for the City of York. Both the City of York and Vale of York seats were abolished in 2010 and replaced by two new constituencies, namely York Central and York Outer.

Members of Parliament

1265-1660

Short Parliament
 1640: Sir Edward Osborne
 1640: Sir Roger Jaques

Long Parliament
 1640-1653: Sir William Allanson (Parliamentarian)
 1640-1650: Thomas Hoyle (Parliamentarian) - died January 1650

Barebones Parliament
 1653: Thomas St. Nicholas

First Protectorate Parliament
 1654-1655: Sir Thomas Widdrington
 1654-1655: Thomas Dickinson

Second Protectorate Parliament
 1656: Sir Thomas Widdrington (Elected for more than one constituency, and did not sit for York in this Parliament)
 1656-1658: John Geldart
 1656-1658: Thomas Dickinson

Third Protectorate Parliament
 1659: Christopher Topham
 1659: Thomas Dickinson

Long Parliament (restored)
 1659-1660: Sir William Allanson; Thomas Hoyle, died, one seat vacant

1660-1918

1918–2010

Elections

Elections in the 1830s

 
 
 

 

 
 
 
 

Bayntun's death caused a by-election.

 
 

 Lowther was not present for the election, as he was in France

 
 
 

 
 
 

Elections in the 1840s

 
 
 

 
 

Yorke's death caused a by-election.

 
 
 

Elections in the 1850s

 
 
 

 
 
 

 
 
 

Elections in the 1860s

 

 

 

Elections in the 1870s

Westhead resigned, causing a by-election.

 
 

Lowther was appointed Chief Secretary to the Lord Lieutenant of Ireland, requiring a by-election.

Elections in the 1880s

 

Leeman's death caused a by-election.

Elections in the 1890s

Lockwood was appointed Solicitor General for England and Wales, requiring a by-election.

Lockwood's death caused a by-election.

This result was subject to a recount, with the original result putting Beresford on 5,659 votes, and Furness with 5,648 votes. The recount then led to the above result. 17 ballot papers were reserved for judgement, of which 12 were in favour of Beresford. Beresford was told he was able to substantiate 11 ballot papers, while Furness was given an estimate of four, leading to Beresford being declared MP.

Elections in the 1900s

Elections in the 1910s

 General Election 1914–15:

Another General Election was required to take place before the end of 1915. The political parties had been making preparations for an election to take place and by the July 1914, the following candidates had been selected; Unionist: John Butcher Liberal: Arnold RowntreeLabour: Henry Slesser
Representation reduced to one

Elections in the 1920s

Elections in the 1930s

Election in the 1940s

Elections in the 1950s

Elections in the 1960s

Elections in the 1970s

Elections in the 1980s

Elections in the 1990s

Elections in the 2000s

See also
 List of parliamentary constituencies in North Yorkshire

Notes and referencesNotesReferences'''

Parliamentary constituencies in Yorkshire and the Humber (historic)
Constituencies of the Parliament of the United Kingdom established in 1265
Constituencies of the Parliament of the United Kingdom disestablished in 2010
Politics of York